Alejandro Bichir Batres is a Mexican actor and a member of the Bichir family. He is the husband of Maricruz Nájera, and the father of Odiseo, Demián and Bruno Bichir.

References 

Living people
Mexican film directors
Mexican male film actors
Mexican screenwriters
Mexican male television actors
Year of birth missing (living people)